The Apatani (or Tanw, Tanii) are a tribal group of people living in the Ziro valley in the Lower Subansiri district of Arunachal Pradesh in India. This tribe speaks the languages Apatani, English and Hindi.

Customs and lifestyle 
Their wet rice cultivation system and their agriculture system are extensive even without the use of any farm animals or machines. So is their sustainable social forestry system. UNESCO has proposed the Apatani valley for inclusion as a World Heritage Site for its "extremely high productivity" and "unique" way of preserving the ecology. They have two major festivals – Dree and Myoko. In July, the agricultural festival of Dree is celebrated with prayers for a bumper harvest and prosperity of all humankind. Paku-Itu, Daminda, Piree dance, etc., are the main cultural programmes performed in the festival. Myoko is celebrated to commemorate the intervillage friendship that has been passed down by the forefathers for generations until present. This special bond is carried forward in the succeeding generation by the current members. It is celebrated for almost a month - from the mid of March to the mid of April. During this period a huge amount of food and drinks are being served and distributed by the host village.

The Apatanis, one of the major ethnic groups of eastern Himalayas, have a distinct civilization with systematic land-use practices and rich traditional ecological knowledge of natural resources management and conservation, acquired over the centuries through informal experimentation. The tribe is known for their colorful culture with various festivals, intricate handloom designs, skills in cane and bamboo crafts, and vibrant traditional village councils called bulyañ. This has made the Ziro Valley a good example of a living cultural landscape where humans and the environment have harmoniously existed together in a state of interdependence even through changing times, such co-existence being nurtured by the traditional customs and spiritual belief systems.

References

External links 
Apatani Language in endangered list.

Further reading 
 von Fürer-Haimendorf, Christopher. (1962) The Apa Tanis and Their Neighbors. New York: The Free Press of Glencoe.

Tribes of Arunachal Pradesh
Lower Subansiri district